For the felony murder rule in all U.S. jurisdictions, see felony murder rule.

In the state of West Virginia the common law felony murder rule is codified at W. Va. Code § 61-2-1 (1991). This statute provides that someone kills another during the commission of, or attempt to commit arson, kidnapping, sexual assault, robbery, burglary, breaking and entering, escape from lawful custody, or a felony offense of manufacturing or delivering a controlled substance shall be guilty of first degree murder.

References

U.S. state criminal law
West Virginia law